The men's singles two wood is one of the events at the annual Bowls England National Championships.

The two-wood singles is a newer variation of the game; see Glossary of bowls terms.

Past winners

References

Bowls in England